1990 in Korea may refer to:
1990 in North Korea
1990 in South Korea